Scott Thompson (born 14 March 1983) is a former Australian rules footballer who played for the Melbourne Football Club and Adelaide Football Club in the Australian Football League (AFL).

AFL career

Melbourne (2001–2004)
After winning the club's Best First Year Player award in 2001, subsequent injuries caused him to struggle to break into the side for the next two years. In 2004 he played every game (barring a one-match suspension for striking) before breaking his foot against  in round 13 and missing the remainder of the year.

Adelaide (2005–2017)
Thompson missed the first game of the 2005 season but played every game from then on for Adelaide, kicking 27 goals for the year. Thompson continued to improve and by 2007 had become arguably one of the elite players in the AFL, averaging almost 25 disposals and 6 marks per game and polling 18 votes in the 2007 Brownlow Medal to finish equal 7th.

Thompson played every game in 2008 and finished third in the Malcolm Blight Medal (Adelaide best and fairest) and for the second year in a row polling the most votes for his club in the Brownlow Medal. Thompson was chosen to play for Australia in the 2008 International Rules Series against Ireland in October 2008 along with teammate Nathan Bock, but was only able to play in the first match due to a leg injury. In the same year, he narrowly avoided a jail term over driving offenses.

After being among Adelaide's best players in a poor 2010 season, Thompson was runner-up to Richard Douglas in the Malcolm Blight Medal for Adelaide's best and fairest player. He went one better the next year, winning the award in a landslide after racking up the second most disposals in the entire competition. His season included a 51 disposal game in round 22 against : the second highest amount of disposals in a match by an VFL/AFL player since the recording of statistics, falling two short of Greg Williams' 53 disposals in 1989. Thompson continued to dominate the following season, winning his second consecutive Malcolm Blight Medal and being named in the All-Australian team. He also finished equal fourth in the Brownlow Medal.

Thompson continued to be an integral part of the Crows' midfield in 2013 and 2014, ranking near the top at the club for disposals (1st and 3rd), clearances (1st and 2nd) and tackles (1st and 3rd). He played his 250th AFL match against  in round 5, 2014. In round 20 he was forced out of the side due to injury after having played 99 consecutive games for the club. Thompson missed the opening two rounds in 2015, but rebounded to remain one of Adelaide's best midfielders, averaging 26.7 disposals and finishing seventh in Adelaide's club champion award.

He continued to perform consistently, averaging 24 disposals per game and leading the club in clearances and centre clearances. He signed a new one-year contract at the end of the season, with the understanding that his role would include some coaching responsibilities as well as playing.

Coach Don Pyke flagged the possibility of a new role for Thompson across half-back during the 2017 season. He announced his retirement from AFL a few weeks later, planning to play out the rest of the season in Adelaide's SANFL side. At the end of the season he won Adelaide's State League Club Champion as the best player in Adelaide's reserves team. He won it by a single vote over Tom Doedee.

Coaching career
In November 2017, Thompson was announced as a development coach for the Port Adelaide Football Club. He held this role until April 2020. As of 2022, Thompson is coaching the Unley Mercedes Jets in Division 2 of the Adelaide Footy League.

Statistics

|- style="background:#eaeaea;"
! scope="row" style="text-align:center" | 2001
| style="text-align:center" | 
| 6 || 9 || 2 || 1 || 51 || 27 || 78 || 19 || 8 || 0.2 || 0.1 || 5.7 || 3.0 || 8.7 || 2.1 || 0.9
|-
! scope="row" style="text-align:center" | 2002
| style="text-align:center" | 
| 6 || 5 || 2 || 1 || 33 || 16 || 49 || 15 || 11 || 0.4 || 0.2 || 6.6 || 3.2 || 9.8 || 3.0 || 2.2
|- style="background:#eaeaea;"
! scope="row" style="text-align:center" | 2003
| style="text-align:center" | 
| 6 || 13 || 5 || 3 || 82 || 84 || 166 || 34 || 32 || 0.4 || 0.2 || 6.3 || 6.5 || 12.8 || 2.6 || 2.5
|-
! scope="row" style="text-align:center" | 2004
| style="text-align:center" | 
| 6 || 12 || 8 || 4 || 116 || 72 || 188 || 56 || 46 || 0.7 || 0.3 || 9.7 || 6.0 || 15.7 || 4.7 || 3.8
|- style="background:#eaeaea;"
! scope="row" style="text-align:center" | 2005
| style="text-align:center" | 
| 5 || 24 || 27 || 17 || 267 || 166 || 433 || 107 || 96 || 1.1 || 0.7 || 11.1 || 6.9 || 18.0 || 4.5 || 4.0
|- 
! scope="row" style="text-align:center" | 2006
| style="text-align:center" | 
| 5 || 23 || 22 || 10 || 280 || 191 || 471 || 135 || 86 || 1.0 || 0.4 || 12.2 || 8.3 || 20.5 || 5.9 || 3.7
|- style="background:#eaeaea;"
! scope="row" style="text-align:center" | 2007
| style="text-align:center" | 
| 5 || 23 || 16 || 16 || 309 || 271 || 580 || 132 || 101 || 0.7 || 0.7 || 13.4 || 11.8 || 25.2 || 5.7 || 4.4
|- 
! scope="row" style="text-align:center" | 2008
| style="text-align:center" | 
| 5 || 23 || 16 || 10 || 302 || 254 || 556 || 114 || 109 || 0.7 || 0.4 || 13.1 || 11.0 || 24.2 || 5.0 || 4.7
|- style="background:#eaeaea;"
! scope="row" style="text-align:center" | 2009
| style="text-align:center" | 
| 5 || 23 || 11 || 10 || 253 || 352 || 605 || 114 || 99 || 0.5 || 0.4 || 11.0 || 15.3 || 26.3 || 5.0 || 4.3
|- 
! scope="row" style="text-align:center" | 2010
| style="text-align:center" | 
| 5 || 21 || 12 || 9 || 276 || 261 || 537 || 84 || 100 || 0.6 || 0.4 || 13.1 || 12.4 || 25.6 || 4.0 || 4.8
|- style="background:#eaeaea;"
! scope="row" style="text-align:center" | 2011
| style="text-align:center" | 
| 5 || 22 || 8 || 6 || 343 || 330 || 673 || 94 || 119 || 0.4 || 0.3 || 15.6 || 15.0 || 30.6 || 4.3 || 5.4
|- 
! scope="row" style="text-align:center" | 2012
| style="text-align:center" | 
| 5 || 25 || 10 || 15 || 410 || 327 || 737 || 108 || 119 || 0.4 || 0.6 || 16.4 || 13.1 || 29.5 || 4.3 || 4.8
|- style="background:#eaeaea;"
! scope="row" style="text-align:center" | 2013
| style="text-align:center" | 
| 5 || 22 || 8 || 9 || 293 || 250 || 543 || 95 || 108 || 0.4 || 0.4 || 13.3 || 11.4 || 24.7 || 4.3 || 4.9
|- 
! scope="row" style="text-align:center" | 2014
| style="text-align:center" | 
| 5 || 19 || 3 || 7 || 257 || 262 || 519 || 69 || 86 || 0.2 || 0.4 || 13.5 || 13.8 || 27.3 || 3.6 || 4.5
|- style="background:#eaeaea;"
! scope="row" style="text-align:center" | 2015
| style="text-align:center" | 
| 5 || 21 || 8 || 4 || 248 || 313 || 561 || 69 || 127 || 0.4 || 0.2 || 11.8 || 14.9 || 26.7 || 3.3 || 6.0
|- 
! scope="row" style="text-align:center" | 2016
| style="text-align:center" | 
| 5 || 22 || 4 || 3 || 256 || 271 || 527 || 72 || 158 || 0.2 || 0.1 || 11.6 || 12.3 || 24.0 || 3.3 || 7.2
|- style="background:#eaeaea;"
! scope="row" style="text-align:center" | 2017
| style="text-align:center" | 
| 5 || 1 || 0 || 0 || 5 || 5 || 10 || 1 || 5 || 0.0 || 0.0 || 5.0 || 5.0 || 10.0 || 1.0 || 5.0
|- class="sortbottom"
! colspan=3| Career
! 308
! 162
! 125
! 3781
! 3452
! 7233
! 1318
! 1410
! 0.5
! 0.4
! 12.3
! 11.2
! 23.5
! 4.3
! 4.6
|}

References

External links

Demon Wiki profile

Adelaide Football Club players
Melbourne Football Club players
1983 births
Living people
Port Adelaide Magpies players
Australian rules footballers from South Australia
All-Australians (AFL)
Malcolm Blight Medal winners
Adelaide Football Club (SANFL) players
Australia international rules football team players